The 2012 IBAF 18U Baseball World Championship was an international baseball competition held in Seoul, South Korea from August 30 to September 8, 2012.

Medalists

Teams
The following 12 teams qualified for the tournament.

 
 Chinese Taipei is the official IBAF designation for the team representing the state officially referred to as the Republic of China, more commonly known as Taiwan. (See also political status of Taiwan for details.)

Round 1

Group A

Standings

Schedule

Group B

Standings

Schedule

Round 2

Group C

Standings

Schedule

Round 3

11th place game

9th place game

7th place game

5th place game

Bronze medal game

Gold medal game

Final standings

Officials

Technical Commissioners
Chairman:

Jim Baba (CAN)

Members:
 Brett Pickett (AUS)
 Koji Aso (JPN)
 Lin, Hua Wei (TPE)
 George Santiago (PUR)
 Lee, Kyu-Seok (KOR)
 Kang, Moon-Kil (KOR)
 Kim, Byung-Il (KOR)
 Park, Ro-Jun (KOR)
 Son, Hyuk (KOR)

Umpires
Umpire Director:

Gustavo Rodriguez (USA)

Members:
 Gregory Howard (AUS)
 Jon Oko (CAN)
 Bin Shun Chen (TPE)
 David Kulhanek (CZE)
 Marco Taurelli (ITA)
 Tomohisa Yamaguchi (JPN)
 Hi Young Park (KOR)
 Osmel Pimentel (VEN)
 Kou Wakabayashi (JPN)
 David Condon (USA)
 Kevin Sweeney (USA)
 Batista Fermin (PAN)
 Do Hyung Kim (KOR)
 Yang, Jae Man (KOR)
 Jae Hoon Lim (KOR)
 Seong Jun Park (KOR)
 Suk Man Hwang (KOR)
 Won Jung Park (KOR)

Scorers
Scoring Director:

Marco Battistella (ITA)

Members:
 Takuya Sumi (JPN)
 Feiko Drost (NED)
 Jennie Moloney (AUS)
 An, Woo Jun (KOR)
 Oh, Ik Hwan (KOR)
 Hwang, Sung Jun (KOR)
 Han, In Hii (KOR)
 Kim Young Sung (KOR)

Jury of Appeal
Chairman:

Gustavo Rodriguez (USA)

Members:
 Sang Hyung Lee (KOR)
 Gianni Fabrizi (ITA)

References

World Junior Baseball Championship
U-18 Baseball World Cup
2012
Sports competitions in Seoul
18U Baseball World Championship
18U Baseball World Championship
2010s in Seoul